The Lighidia is a right tributary of the river Miniș in Romania. It discharges into the Miniș near Bozovici.

References

Rivers of Caraș-Severin County
Rivers of Romania